In mathematics, specifically group theory, the identity component of a group G refers to several closely related notions of the largest connected subgroup of G containing the identity element. 

In point set topology, the identity component of a topological group G is the connected component G0 of G that contains the identity element of the group. The identity path component of a topological group G is the path component of G that contains the identity element of the group. 

In algebraic geometry, the identity component of an algebraic group G over a field k is the identity component of the underlying topological space. The identity component of a group scheme G over a base scheme S is, roughly speaking, the group scheme G0 whose fiber over the point s of S is the connected component (Gs)0 of the fiber Gs, an algebraic group.

Properties 
The identity component G0 of a topological or algebraic group G is a closed normal subgroup of G. It is closed since components are always closed. It is a subgroup since multiplication and inversion in a topological or algebraic group are continuous maps by definition. Moreover, for any continuous automorphism a of G we have  

a(G0) = G0.

Thus, G0 is a characteristic subgroup of G, so it is normal.

The identity component G0 of a topological group G need not be open in G. In fact, we may have G0 = {e}, in which case G is totally disconnected. However, the identity component of a locally path-connected space (for instance a Lie group) is always open, since it contains a path-connected neighbourhood of {e}; and therefore is a clopen set. 

The identity path component of a topological group may in general be smaller than the identity component (since path connectedness is a stronger condition than connectedness), but these agree if G is locally path-connected.

Component group 
The quotient group G/G0 is called the group of components or component group of G. Its elements are just the connected components of G. The component group G/G0 is a discrete group if and only if G0 is open. If G is an algebraic group of  finite type, such as an affine algebraic group, then G/G0 is actually a finite group.

One may similarly define the path component group as the group of path components (quotient of G by the identity path component), and in general the component group is a quotient of the path component group, but if G is locally path connected these groups agree. The path component group can also be characterized as the zeroth homotopy group,

Examples
The group of non-zero real numbers with multiplication (R*,•) has two components and the group of components is ({1,−1},•).
Consider the group of units U in the ring of split-complex numbers. In the ordinary topology of the plane {z = x + j y : x, y ∈ R}, U is divided into four components by the lines y = x and y = − x where z has no inverse. Then U0 = { z : |y| < x } . In this case the group of components of U is isomorphic to the Klein four-group.
The identity component of the additive group (Zp,+) of  p-adic integers is the singleton set {0}, since Zp is totally disconnected.
The Weyl group of a  reductive algebraic group G is the components group of the  normalizer group of a maximal torus of G.
Consider the group scheme μ2 = Spec(Z[x]/(x2 - 1)) of second  roots of unity defined over the base scheme Spec(Z). Topologically, μn consists of two copies of the curve Spec(Z) glued together at the point (that is, prime ideal) 2. Therefore, μn is connected as a topological space, hence as a scheme. However, μ2 does not equal its identity component because the fiber over every point of Spec(Z) except 2 consists of two discrete points.

An algebraic group G over a  topological field K admits two natural topologies, the Zariski topology and the topology inherited from K. The identity component of G often changes depending on the topology. For instance, the general linear group GLn(R) is connected as an algebraic group but has two path components as a Lie group, the matrices of positive determinant and the matrices of negative determinant. Any connected algebraic group over a non-Archimedean local field K is totally disconnected in the K-topology and thus has trivial identity component in that topology.

note

References

Lev Semenovich Pontryagin, Topological Groups, 1966.

External links
 Revised and annotated edition of the 1970 original.

Topological groups
Lie groups